Aliabad, Lerik may refer to:

Aliabad (38° 41' N 48° 33' E), Lerik
Aliabad (38° 50' N 48° 37' E), Lerik